Katherine "Katie" Herring (later James; July 11, 1933 – November 4, 2018) was an All-American Girls Professional Baseball League player. Listed at 5' 4", 118 Lb., Herring batted and threw right handed. She was dubbed Katie by her teammates.

Biography
Born in Friendship, Oklahoma to  William D. and Beryl (Martin) Herring, Katherine Herring joined the league in its 1953 season. She was assigned to the Grand Rapids Chicks as an outfielder. Additional information is incomplete because there are no records available at the time of the request.

In 1988 was inaugurated a permanent display at the Baseball Hall of Fame and Museum at Cooperstown, New York, that honors those who were part of the All-American Girls Professional Baseball League. Katie Herring, along with the rest of the girls and the league staff, is included at the display/exhibit.

Katherine Herring James, the widow of Paul C. James Sr. (died November 2, 2013) died in Tamaqua, Pennsylvania on November 4, 2018, aged 85. She was survived by her two sons, three of her siblings, and three grandchildren.

Sources

1933 births
2018 deaths
All-American Girls Professional Baseball League players
Grand Rapids Chicks players
Baseball players from Oklahoma
People from Jackson County, Oklahoma
21st-century American women